Sesheke District is a district of Zambia, located in Western Province. The capital lies at Sesheke. As of the 2000 Zambian Census, the district had a population of 78,169 people. It contains Sioma Ngwezi National Park and contains part of the Zambezi River, which forms Zambia's border with Namibia.

References

Districts of Western Province, Zambia